Nancy B. Clark of Marstons Mills, Massachusetts, is a philatelist who has served the philatelic community by her pioneering work with the Boy Scouts of America and her dedication to work at the American Philatelic Society.

Philatelic activity
Nancy Clark, during her philatelic career, has dedicated much of her time to children, developing in them an interest in stamp collecting. She has assisted Boy Scout groups with philatelic activities that led to boys obtaining badges for stamp collecting. She has also introduced stamp collecting to grammar school students and helped them develop skills in exhibiting their displays of stamps.

Clark has been also very active with both the national and international philatelic organizations. She has been a member of the American Philatelic Society where she served on various committees, was director at large, and was appointed society treasurer. She has also been a Fellow of the Royal Philatelic Society London. She was appointed Interpretive Master Planner for the Spellman Museum of Stamps and Postal History in 2010.

She is serving as president of the show committee for World Stamp Show Boston 2026.

She also hosted APS Stamp Talk with Nancy Clark, an online radio show that airs multiple times a year and features guests from organized philately for seventeen years.

On the local level, Clark has served in numerous positions in various organizations. At the Rochester Philatelic Association she has served as president and vice president. She was one of the founders of Georgia Federation of Stamp Clubs, the Peach State Stamp Show, and the Auxiliary Markings Club. She has also served as secretary of the Massachusetts Postal Research Society and served the Mobile Post Office Society as treasurer.

Philatelic literature
Clark is a prolific writer of philatelic articles which have appeared in The American Philatelist, the American Philatelic Congress books, Scott Stamp Monthly, and other philatelic publications.

Clark served as a philatelic literature judge at Chicagopex 2017 in Itasca, Illinois.

Community involvement
Clark has been acting in supporting public libraries, serving on the board for libraries in two states: Cliffside Park in New Jersey, and Oglethorpe County and Athens-Clarke County in Georgia. She wrote book reviews for The Oglethorpe Echo newspaper for several years.

Clark has worked on and chaired Historic preservation commissions in Georgia and Massachusetts: City of Oglethorpe, GA, and Town of Barnstable, MA.

She published a children's book authored by her husband, Douglas Clark, and mother-in-law Eleanor Linton Clark and illustrated by her sister-in-law, Broadway designer Peggy Clark Kelly in 2002.

Honors and awards
Clark has received awards for her work including the Georgia Federation of Stamp Clubs Service Award, the Rowland Hill Lifetime Achievement Award of the Southeast Federation of Stamp Clubs, the APS Ernest Kehr Award, and the Clyde Jennings Award of the Errors, Freaks, and Oddities Collectors Club.

In 2008 Clark received the Luff Award for Exceptional Contributions to Philately from the American Philatelic Society.

In 2018 she received the Neinkin Award from the Philatelic Foundation, recognizing meritorious service to philately.

References

Philatelic literature
American philatelists
People from Marstons Mills, Massachusetts
Living people
Year of birth missing (living people)
Women philatelists